The ochre-breasted brushfinch (Atlapetes semirufus) is a species of bird in the family Passerellidae.

It is found in Colombia and Venezuela. Its natural habitats are subtropical or tropical moist montane forest and heavily degraded former forest.

References

ochre-breasted brush finch
Birds of the Colombian Andes
Birds of the Venezuelan Andes
Birds of the Venezuelan Coastal Range
ochre-breasted brush finch
Taxonomy articles created by Polbot